Mula sa Puso (International title: From the Heart) is a 2011 Philippine television series Lauren Young, JM De Guzman and Enrique Gil. It is a modern remake of the original 1997 TV series that starred Claudine Barretto, Rico Yan and Diether Ocampo airing on ABS-CBN from March 10, 1997, to April 9, 1999. The show was directed by Wenn V. Deramas, who also penned both the original version and its film adoption. This is the second soap opera remake of the network after its initial success and high ratings of the 2010 remake, Mara Clara. The show's original airing was at 6:00pm in 1997-1999 and was used again broadcasting this 2011 replacing Sabel in its previous timeslot and was replaced by Maria la del Barrio.

Overview

Adaptation

Mula sa Puso is a remake of the 1997 television series of the same title. The original version starred Claudine Barretto as Via, Rico Yan as Gabriel and Diether Ocampo as Michael. Two years after the series had its finale in 1999, it was adapted into a film where the whole cast reprised their roles except Ricardo Cepeda and Snooky Serna who played Abdon and Criselda. In March 2011, ABS-CBN announced that they had decided to remake the television series after the success of Mara Clara. The remake will star Lauren Young as Via, JM De Guzman as Gabriel, and Enrique Gil as Michael. Ariel Rivera and Eula Valdez, who were both part of the 1997 series and the 1999 film, joined the cast playing different roles this time. Wenn V. Deramas who directed the 1997 series and the 1999 film stepped in to direct the remake. The series adaptation is part of Kapamilya Gold, ABS-CBN's promotion for its upcoming series such as Nasaan Ka Elisa?, Maria la del Barrio and Hiyas.

Synopsis
Via (Lauren Young) has been treated like a princess by her father, Don Fernando (Ariel Rivera), a millionaire. On Via's eighteenth birthday, her hand was given to her childhood friend Michael (Enrique Gil) for marriage, although she does not have feelings for him like he does for her. Amid this drama, a revelation will begin when Via's aunt, Selina (Eula Valdez) plots her personal retribution on her brother, at the expense of Via. In the process, Via will meet Gabriel (JM de Guzman) who will save her from her heartache and become her hero in disguise. She will also cross paths with her real identity of her real mother Magda (Dawn Zulueta) who happens to be Gabriel's adoptive mother.

Cast and characters

Main cast
Lauren Young as Olivia "Via" Pereira-Amarillo - the main female/primary protagonist of the series, originally portrayed by Claudine Barretto. She is the good daughter of Don Fernando and Magdalena Pereira. Olivia's real name was Angelica, given to her by her biological mother, but as she got raised by her father and her father's wife, she grew up with the name Olivia, or "Via" for short. Later she married Gabriel.
JM De Guzman as Gabriel Maglayon-Amarillo - the main male protagonist of the series, originally portrayed by Rico Yan. He is the son of Rocco. A kind hearted and hardworking young taxi driver who will do everything to earn the trust of Don Fernando and to prove his love for Olivia Pereira. Later he married Via.
Enrique Gil as Michael Miranda - the main male protagonist of the series, originally portrayed by Diether Ocampo. Via's friend, he had special feelings for her.

Supporting cast
Dawn Zulueta as Magdalena "Magda" Trinidad-Pereira - the secondary female protagonist of the series, originally portrayed by Jaclyn Jose. The lost mother of Via. She fell in love with Don Fernando and she has a scar face after surviving an acid attack by Selina. Later she married Don Fernando. 
Eula Valdez as Selina Pereira-Matias - the main female/primary antagonist of the series, originally portrayed by Princess Punzalan. She is the sister of Don Fernando, however, she is not his biological sister. She is clever, quick-thinking, and intelligent, but at the same time evil scheme, greedy, and merciless to others especially having deep revenge, and a grudge she held over Magda. She perpetrated the acid attack which left a scar on Magda's face. She married Ysmael and had a daughter named Nicole and an older son named Gilbert. One day trying to kill Via, she saw Nicole in the bus with bombs and she was killed instead. Selina got severely burned after finding Nicole inside the exploded bus. In the end, she was killed by a speeding truck while showing her pride and quarreling with her neighbors. As she was dying bloodily, the flashbacks of the painful past that happened to her and the horrible crimes she did were seen.
Ariel Rivera as Don Fernando Pereira - the secondary male protagonist of the series, originally portrayed by Juan Rodrigo. Via's father who lives a full life of deceit by his adoptive sister Selina and will face the truth amidst of it all that he and Magda are still meant to be after so many trials and tribulations.
Charee Pineda as Katherine "Kate" Dela Cruz/Sister Katherine - She treats Ninong as her father. She later fell in love with Gabriel. And later, she became a nun.
DJ Durano as Ysmael Matias - Selina's husband. 
Tyron Perez as Gilbert Matias - Ysmael's son and Nicole's half-brother. His love interest is Via.
Cris Villanueva as Rocco Amarillo - The biological father of Gabriel who saved the life of Magda. He died after being shot by Selina. He is buried beside his wife at the family ranch.
Sue Anne Ramirez as Nicole Matias - Ysmael and Selina's loving daughter, towards the end of the series, she rebels against her parents and joins Via. However, she tragically dies in a bus accident on the way to Baguio, after an explosion, which was meant to kill Via. The bomb was placed directly near their seat, thus killing everyone on the bus.
Minco Fabregas as Atty. Samuel Miranda - The father of Michael and a friend of Don Fernando.
Rochelle Barrameda as Monique Miranda -  The mother of Michael.
Neri Naig as Jaja Lampaz/Fake Selina - Selina had her face changed to look like her.
Paul Salas as Warren Maglayon - Magda's son and Gabriel's brother. He falls in love with Nicole.

Special participation
Assunta De Rossi as Criselda Pereira
Alicia Alonzo as Minerva Trinidad
Lito Legaspi as Luis Vergara
John Arcilla as Don Fernando Pereira Sr.
Kristel Fulgar as teen Selina Pereira
Mark Sayarot as teen Don Fernando Pereira Jr.
Sophia Baars as Young Olivia Pereira
Joseph Andre Garcia as Young Gabriel Maglayon
Bobby Yan as Lando
Manuel Chua as Armando "Abdon" Macasaet

Differences for the original and remake

Trivia
In the readaptation, it did not have more characters as the original.
 This is Lauren Young's big break in showbiz and last show in ABS-CBN before moving to GMA Network in 2012. 
 This is Eula Valdez, Ariel Rivera and Cris Villanueva's comeback show in ABS-CBN, after leaving GMA Network in both 2010 and 2011.
 Ariel Rivera is the only cast member who is a former cast member of the 1997 version. 
 This is Tyron Perez's last show, before his death in December 2011. 
 This is Dawn Zulueta's comeback drama television show after three years since Mars Ravelo's Lastikman in 2007.

See also
List of programs aired by ABS-CBN
List of drama series of ABS-CBN
Mula sa Puso

References

External links
Official website
 

ABS-CBN drama series
2011 Philippine television series debuts
2011 Philippine television series endings
Television series reboots
Philippine action television series
Philippine crime television series
Philippine thriller television series
Espionage television series
Philippine romance television series
Filipino-language television shows
Television shows set in the Philippines